Branov is a municipality and village in Rakovník District in the Central Bohemian Region of the Czech Republic. It has about 200 inhabitants.

Geography
Most of the municipal territory lies in the Křivoklát Highlands, the northern part lies in the Plasy Uplands. The municipality is situated on the right bank of the Berounka River, which forms the northern municipal border. The entire municipality lies in the Křivoklátsko Protected Landscape Area.

History
The first written mention of Branov is from 1551.

References

External links

Villages in Rakovník District